Civilisation is the fourth studio album by French rapper Orelsan, released on 19 November 2021 through 7th Magnitude, 3e Bureau and Wagram. The album was largely produced by long-time collaborator Skread and features guest appearances by Gringe and The Neptunes. It marks his first album release in over four years.

The album made a record-breaking debut on the French Albums Chart, selling more units than any other album in 2021. The album topped at 1st on French and Belgian (Wallonia) charts, as well as 2nd on Swiss charts at its best week. It was certified diamond by the SNEP within five months in France, becoming the fastest album to be certified diamond in the history of French rap.

According to the SNEP, Civilisation was the No.1 selling album in France for two consecutive years of 2021 and 2022.

Background and reception

Prior to its release, Orelsan did not reveal much about the album. According to him, in his mind the record signifies a "deconstruction". In late October 2021, it was announced that physical copies of the album would arrive in 15 different designs. Two vinyl editions of the album were released on 10 December 2021.

Civilisation sees the rapper departing from his "crazed humour" trademark style, instead settling for more "commited and personal tracks", in a soundscape between "drill" and "disco". French publication Le Parisien called Civilisation the best French rap album of 2021. However, the record was also criticised for containing too much singing while it was also noted that the rapper took himself too seriously at times.

Commercial performance
In its first three days, Civilisation sold 94,306 units, beating a record previously held by PNL's Deux frères (2019). The album arrived atop the French Albums Chart, moving 138,929 units in its first week, 96,615 of which were physical sales. The sum reset the record for the largest opening week in France for an album in 2021, beating Adele's 30 which debuted at number two the same week. 

The lead single "L'odeur de l'essence" reached number one on the French Singles Chart. The other lead single "Jour Meilleur" reached number one the following week. All of the album tracks entered the French Singles Chart Top 20 in its first week, nine of which reached the Top 10.

Track listing

Charts

Weekly charts

Year-end charts

Certifications

References

2021 albums
7th Magnitude albums
Albums produced by Skread
French-language albums
Orelsan albums